Project 20386 is Russia's newest class of corvettes being constructed by Severnaya Verf for the Russian Navy. There are plans to build a series of at least ten such corvettes.

History
The lead ship of the class was laid down on 28 October 2016 and is expected to enter service after 2020. In February 2019, the technical readiness of the lead vessel reached 12%. On 9 April 2019, Russian Defence Minister Sergey Shoygu announced, the ship will be named Merkuriy (Mercury). However, the name may have been again changed to Derzky.

Appearances 
The ship also appears in media, such as video games like Modern Warships under the name RF Derzkiy. However, such appearance is not accurate, featuring the incorrect helicopter and torpedoes, and missing a cannon. It is also notably slower, lighter, and wider.

Ships

References

Corvettes of the Russian Navy
Corvette classes
Ships built in Russia